The Junior World Records in Swimming are the fastest times ever swum by a "junior" swimmer, with junior defined as the following ages (age as of December 31 of the year of the swim):
girls - 18 years old or younger
boys - 18 years old or younger

These records are kept/maintained by the FINA (now World Aquatics), and were initially established in March 2014 and based on the meet records from the Junior Worlds meet.

Note: in some cases, there were existing world records (e.g. Katie Ledecky's 400, 800 and 1500 m freestyle, Rūta Meilutytė's 100 m breaststroke) that were not considered for these records (but were faster). Likewise more historical times by juniors were also not considered (e.g. Mary T. Meagher's 2:05.96 in the 200 m butterfly).

Long Course records can be established by breaking the initial time at a meet after April 1, 2014. FINA World Junior Records in 25m pool are recognised starting on January 1, 2015.

Records are recognized for long course (50 m pool) and short course (25 m pool) in the following events:
freestyle: 50, 100, 200, 400, 800 and 1500;
backstroke: 50, 100 and 200;
breaststroke: 50, 100 and 200;
butterfly: 50, 100 and 200;
Individual medley: 100 (short course only), 200 and 400;
relays: 4×50 free (short course only), 4×100 free, 4×200 free, 4×50 medley (short course only) and 4×100 medley.
Also recognized are mixed relay records for 4 × 100 medley and free relays.

All records were swum in finals unless noted otherwise.

Long Course (50 m)

Boys

Girls

Mixed

Short Course (25 m)

Boys

Girls

Mixed

References
General
World Junior Records – Men Long Course 3 September 2022 updated
World Junior Records – Women Long Course 1 August 2022 updated
World Junior Records – Mixed Relay Long Course 14 October 2019 updated
World Junior Records – Men Short Course 15 December 2022 updated
World Junior Records – Women Short Course 4 November 2022 updated
World Junior Records – Mixed Relay Short Course 9 October 2021 updated
Specific

Junior